Walter & Emily is an American sitcom that aired on NBC from November 16, 1991 to February 22, 1992. The series was created by Paul Perlove, and produced by Witt/Thomas Productions in association with Touchstone Television.

Plot
Retired salesman Walter Collins' son Matt, a divorced sportswriter, had custody of his 11-year-old son Zach on the condition that the boy's grandparents, Walter and his wife Emily, would be around to help raise him.

Cast
Brian Keith as Walter Collins
Cloris Leachman as Emily Collins
Christopher McDonald as Matt Collins
Matthew Lawrence as Zach Collins
Edan Gross as Hartley

Episodes

References

External links

1991 American television series debuts
1992 American television series endings
1990s American sitcoms
NBC original programming
Television series by ABC Studios
English-language television shows
Television shows set in San Francisco